Vernay may refer to:

People 
 Arthur Stannard Vernay (1877–1960), US antique collector, hunter and explorer
 Jean-Karl Vernay (born 1987), French racing driver
 Robert Vernay (1907–1979), French screenwriter

Places 
 Vernay, Rhône, a commune (municipality) and former bishopric in the southeastern French region of Rhône-Alpes
 Vernay, Switzerland, a municipality in the Swiss canton of Fribourg

See also
 Verney (disambiguation)
 Verny (disambiguation)